Virtual Self is an extended play (EP) by American electronic music producer Porter Robinson under the alias Virtual Self. The EP was released on November 29, 2017, as the first release on the eponymous record label Virtual Self. Virtual Self is a departure from the sounds of Robinson's debut album Worlds, in favor of a more techno sound inspired by late 90s-early 2000s dance music.

Background 
Upon announcement, previews of the EP's tracks became available on a website announced by the Virtual Self Twitter page.

Virtual Self's first live performance debuted on December 8, 2017 in Brooklyn, New York. The show consisted of an elaborate light show and in tandem with Robinson playing a DJ set. The set included songs from the game Dance Dance Revolution as well as unreleased Virtual Self music and songs from the EP.

Porter Robinson had been plotting the Virtual Self project since 2015.

Critical reception

Philip Sherburne from Pitchfork granted Virtual Self a 5.9/10 and describes the EP as an effort to "make a headlong plunge into an aesthetic rooted in the late 1990s and early 2000s" whose rhythms are "funkless" and "hyperactive", reminiscent of Dance Dance Revolution soundtracks. The critic then pegged "Ghost Voices" as the most contemporary sounding track of the EP and concluded by stating that "Virtual Self hones in on the most garish aspects of Robinson's influences, burning away any possibility of subtlety beneath a billion-watt gleam". Kat Bein of Billboard was positive of the EP, dubbing his alias as "high-concept musical nerdiness with a heavy Final Fantasy vibe" and that the whole record "plays like a killer soundtrack to the best mid-2000s RPG Nintendo forgot to release". DJ Times magazine's Brian Bonavoglia wrote that although the EP's sound was a large change of pace compared to his preceding Worlds album, Virtual Self still maintained all aspects of Robinson's "production brilliance".

Track listing

Release history

Commercial performance 
In the United States, Virtual Self sold 1,000 copies in its first week of release.

References 

Porter Robinson albums
2017 EPs
Eurodance EPs
Trance EPs
Speedcore albums
Hardcore (electronic dance music genre) albums
Rave albums